The 2003 Hungarian Grand Prix (formally the Marlboro Magyar Nagydíj 2003) was a Formula One motor race held on 24 August 2003 at the Hungaroring, Mogyoród, Pest, Hungary. It was the thirteenth round of the 2003 Formula One season. The 70-lap race was won by Renault's Fernando Alonso after starting from pole position, becoming at the time the youngest ever driver to win a Grand Prix, beating the previous record of Bruce McLaren. This record lasted for over five years until it was beaten by Sebastian Vettel at the 2008 Italian Grand Prix. It was the first Formula One win for Renault as a constructor since the 1983 Austrian Grand Prix. It was also the first Formula One win for the Enstone-based Formula One team since 1997 German Grand Prix.

It was the first to be held under the newly revamped Hungaroring, with the main straight lengthened and the first hairpin tightened, as well as further alterations near the latter stages of the lap in order to encourage more overtaking.

Report

Friday drivers 
The 3 teams in the 2003 Constructors' Championship had the right to drive a third car on Friday that were involved in additional training. These drivers did not compete in qualifying or the race.

Practice 

During practice Jordan driver Ralph Firman suffered a horrendous crash when his rear wing failed, causing his car to swap ends immediately and collide backwards into the crash barriers with such force that he was knocked unconscious and had to sit out the race. He was replaced by local driver Zsolt Baumgartner making his Formula One debut at his home Grand Prix.

Race 

Alonso, starting from pole on the clean side of the track, made a clean start and lead into the first corner, while the two Williams of Ralf Schumacher and Juan Pablo Montoya, who had started second and fourth respectively on the dirty line had difficulty getting away and were down to around tenth place by the first corner, being compounded by Schumacher's spin at the second corner.

The McLaren-Mercedes of Kimi Räikkönen managed to climb to third on the opening lap from his grid position of seventh. With Mark Webber struggling in second place, Alonso managed to gain 7s in the first three laps and 21s in the first 13 laps before being forced to pit for fuel. Webber, who had also light-fueled to a high qualifying position, also pitted. Alonso reentered the track in second place, just behind Räikkönen, while Webber dropped much further down the field. At the end of the 16th lap, Räikkönen, Barrichello and Montoya all pitted, allowing Alonso to resume his lead.

On lap 17 Jacques Villeneuve's BAR came to a halt with a hydraulic failure before Michael Schumacher pitted, and was passed by Montoya while in the pits, who had been able to do a quicker lap while not being held up by Schumacher. On the following lap, David Coulthard, the last of the front-runners, who had been in front of both Schumacher and Montoya, pitted for a very long fuel stop, re-entering behind both. On lap 19, the Ferrari of Rubens Barrichello suffered a left rear suspension failure, sending him straight on at the first corner hairpin, into the wall. The race stewards decided against deploying the safety car, preserving Alonso's 24s lead over Räikkönen, who rejoined ahead of Webber and proceeded to pull away from the Australian.

Alonso's teammate Jarno Trulli led a train of Montoya, Michael and Ralf Schumacher in a train of cars battling for fourth place, when Ralf overtook his brother on the 28th lap. Alonso and Webber were again the first to have a second fuel stop, on lap 30 and 31 respectively but this time Alonso had enough of a lead to re-enter the track ahead of Räikkönen while Webber dropped to ninth after his stop.

Trulli pitted on the next lap, allowing the faster Williams duo of Montoya and Ralf Schumacher into clear air to set fast laps required to jump him, after Räikkönen rejoined after his pit stop behind them, therefore not causing any impedance. Ralf Schumacher immediately pitted on the next lap and rejoined ahead of Trulli but behind Webber who set a fast lap. Montoya set the fastest lap of the race on the next lap, and pitted on the next, exiting in front of Webber as well as Ralf Schumacher and with a clear track in front of him, became the fastest driver on the circuit. On lap 38 Michael Schumacher was in third place, with Coulthard in fourth, followed by Montoya, Webber, Ralf Schumacher and Trulli. Michael Schumacher then pitted, rejoining close behind Trulli, while Webber attempted to hold off Ralf Schumacher.

After a long first stop, third-placed Coulthard was the last to pit on lap 43, again with a long stop, indicating that he has switched to a two-stop strategy and rejoined between Trulli and Michael Schumacher. On lap 46, Ralf Schumacher finally passed Webber for fourth place, but was too far behind third-placed Montoya who had not been held up by Webber. The third round of pit stops saw no change in the order, aside from Coulthard who moved up to fifth behind Ralf Schumacher as a result of not having to pit. Alonso eventually lapped Schumacher, while Montoya spun in the latter stages of the race and had to fend off his teammate in the final laps. Alonso ended with a comfortable 16.8s lead over the second-placed Räikkönen.

In the process, reigning world champion and the championship leader Michael Schumacher was lapped by the Spaniard, and only managed to salvage one point for an eighth-place finish. The second and third-place finishers Räikkönen and Montoya respectively cut his championship lead over his two rivals to just two and one point respectively.

Reaction 
After the race, Alonso described the win as "..a dream come true. I am 22 years old and I have my first victory. I hope I have a long career with lots more victories". Jean Todt, the Ferrari team's manager, referred to their performance as "disappointing".

Post-race 
Following the Hungarian GP, Ferrari complained about Michelin front tyres used by its competitors, which, according to the complaint, were wider than allowed towards the end of the race and thereafter. Michelin had to narrow its tyres by the next race.

Classification

Qualifying

Race

Championship standings after the race 
Bold text indicates who still has a mathematical chance of becoming World Champion.

Drivers' Championship standings

Constructors' Championship standings

Note: Only the top five positions are included for both sets of standings.

References

Hungarian Grand Prix
Grand Prix
Hungarian Grand Prix
August 2003 sports events in Europe